Joseph Morgan (born Joseph Martin; 16 May 1981) is a British actor and director. He is best known for his role as Niklaus "Klaus" Mikaelson on The CW's The Vampire Diaries and its spin-off The Originals, in which he is the lead.

Early life
Morgan was born in London, but lived in Swansea for 11 years. He is the oldest child in his family. He was a student at Morriston Comprehensive School and then studied a BTEC Performing Arts course at Gorseinon College (now Gower College Swansea), before moving back to London to study at the Central School of Speech and Drama in his late teens.

Career
Joseph Morgan's first ever acting audition was for Harry Potter and the Chamber of Secrets for Tom Riddle. Morgan starred in the first series of the Sky One television series Hex, as Troy and has appeared in supporting roles in films such as Alexander and Master and Commander: The Far Side of the World and the BBC Two television series The Line of Beauty. He has also appeared in the television series Doc Martin and Casualty and co-starred in Mansfield Park alongside Billie Piper. In 2010 he played the title role in the mini-series "Ben Hur" which first aired on CBC television in Canada and ABC TV in America, on 4 April 2010. 

Morgan played Niklaus Mikaelson in The CW's The Vampire Diaries, and played Lysander in the 2011 film Immortals, alongside Henry Cavill. BuddyTV ranked him number 84 on its list of "TV's Sexiest Men of 2011". In January 2013, a back-door pilot for The Originals, a spin-off series of The Vampire Diaries, began airing with Morgan starring as Niklaus Mikaelson. In 2020, Joseph Morgan starred in Peacock's science fiction drama Brave New World as CJack60/Elliot.

Personal life
Morgan met actress Persia White on the set of The Vampire Diaries. They began dating in 2011 and became engaged in 2014. They married on 5 July 2014 in Ocho Rios, Jamaica. He is stepfather to White's daughter.

He has been a vegan since 2014.

Morgan is a supporter of the charity Positive Women.

Filmography

Film

Television

As director

Awards

References

External links

 
 Acting CV and profile at Curtis Brown Talent Agency
 
 

1981 births
English male film actors
English male television actors
Living people
Male actors from London
Male actors from Swansea
21st-century English male actors